Egypt–Israel relations are foreign relations between Egypt and Israel. The state of war between both countries which dated back to the 1948 Arab–Israeli War culminated in the Yom Kippur War in 1973, and was followed by the 1979 Egypt–Israel peace treaty a year after the Camp David Accords, mediated by U.S. president Jimmy Carter. Full diplomatic relations were established on January 26, 1980, and the formal exchange of ambassadors took place one month later, on February 26, 1980, with Eliyahu Ben-Elissar serving as the first Israeli Ambassador to Egypt, and Saad Mortada as the first Egyptian Ambassador to Israel. Egypt has an embassy in Tel Aviv and a consulate in Eilat. Israel has an embassy in Cairo and a consulate in Alexandria. Their shared border has two official crossings, one at Taba and one at Nitzana. The crossing at Nitzana is for commercial and tourist traffic only. The two countries' borders also meet at the shoreline of the Gulf of Aqaba in the Red Sea.

Peace between Egypt and Israel has lasted for more than forty years and Egypt has become an important strategic partner of Israel. In January 2011, Binyamin Ben-Eliezer, a former defense minister known for his close ties to Egyptian officials, stated that "Egypt is not only our closest friend in the region, the co-operation between us goes beyond the strategic." Nevertheless, the relationship is sometimes described as a "cold peace", with many in Egypt skeptical about its effectiveness. According to the 2019-2020 survey, 13% of Egyptians support diplomatic recognition of Israel while 85% oppose. The Arab-Israeli conflict kept relations cool and anti-Israeli incitement is prevalent in the Egyptian media.

Country comparison

History

Although diplomatic relations were established in 1980, the Egyptian ambassador to Israel was recalled between 1982 and 1988, and again between 2001 and 2005 during the Second Intifada.

In 2003, Egyptian Air Force UAVs entered Israeli airspace and overflew the nuclear research facilities at Nahal Sorek and Palmachim Airbase. Israel threatened to shoot the drones down.

The Egyptian Revolution of 2011, part of the Arab Spring, led to fears in Israel about the future of the treaty. Israeli Prime Minister Benjamin Netanyahu stated initially that he expected any new Egyptian government to adhere to the peace treaty with Israel, as it had served both countries well. After the Egyptian Army took power on 11 February 2011, it announced that Egypt would continue to abide by all its international and regional treaties. Yet Israeli-Egyptian relations reached their lowest level since the 1979 Egypt–Israel peace treaty. The Israeli-Egyptian border became a region of conflict and instability following the rise of terrorist activity in the Sinai Peninsula and following hostility manifestation from masses of Egyptian protesters against Israel in the streets of Cairo. During the final years of the Mubarak administration, the leading Egyptian official conducting contacts with Israel had been the head of Egyptian intelligence Omar Suleiman. Suleiman was ousted from power at the same time as Mubarak, and Israel was said to have very few channels of communication open with Egypt during the events of 2011.

Egypt undermined the Israeli blockade of the Gaza Strip by opening the Rafah border to persons in May 2011. The Muslim Brotherhood in the Egyptian parliament wished to open trade across the border with Gaza, a move said to be resisted by Egypt's Tantawi government.

In the 2011 attack on the Israeli Embassy in Egypt, thousands of Egyptian demonstrators broke into the Israeli embassy in Cairo on Friday, September 9. The Egyptian police stationed at the site attempted to bar entry, firing tear gas into the crowd. After demonstrators entered the first section of the building, the Israeli ambassador and the staff of the embassy were evacuated by Egyptian commandos. After the attack, Israel flew out the Israeli ambassador and about 85 other diplomats and their family members. Following the attack, the Egyptian army declared a state of emergency in the country. Egyptian officials condemned the attack and said that the events were part of an external conspiracy to hurt the stability and foreign relations of Egypt.

After an exchange of rocket fire between Gaza and Israel in March 2012, the Egyptian parliamentary committee for Arab affairs urged the Egyptian government to recall its ambassador to Israel from Tel Aviv, and deport Israel's ambassador in Egypt. This was largely symbolic since only the ruling military council can make such decisions.

In 2012, the Muslim Brotherhood declared their support for the peace treaty, and Israeli Prime Minister Benyamin Netanyahu affirmed he had no problem dealing with the Muslim Brotherhood so long as the peace treaty was respected. Post Mubarak, the Egyptian authorities continued to protect an IDF memorial in the Sinai in keeping with their treaty obligations. The Israelis remained positive about the treaty after MB candidate Mohammed Morsi was elected president in June 2012.
 
On 24 August 2012, a senior Egyptian military source said that Egyptian Defense Minister Abdel Fattah el-Sissi and Israeli Defense Minister Ehud Barak have reached an agreement on the issue of the militarization of the Sinai. Al Hayat reported that Sissi phoned Barak and said that Egypt was committed to maintaining the peace treaty with Israel. Sissi also said that the militarization was temporary, and was needed for security and to fight terrorism. However, an Israeli defense official denied that such a conversation took place.

In August 2012, the Egyptian military entered the de-militarized zone without Israeli approval, in violation of the peace treaty terms.
Egypt has also been reported to have deployed anti-air missiles on the Israeli border, a move which clearly targets Israel, as the Bedouin groups in the Sinai have no aircraft. However other news agencies had reported that the Egyptian military had actually seized anti-aircraft, anti-tank and anti-personnel weaponry which was destined to be smuggled into the Hamas held Gaza strip. This was in addition to destroying over 100 tunnels used for smuggling. In late August 2012, Morsi said that the security operations do not threaten anyone, and "there should not be any kind of international or regional concerns at all from the presence of Egyptian security forces." Morsi added that the campaign was in "full respect to international treaties."

On 8 September 2012, an Israeli official confirmed that coordination exists between Israel and Egypt regarding Operation Eagle. Egyptian Military spokesman Ahmed Mohammed Ali had earlier announced that Egypt has been consulting with Israel regarding its security measures in the Sinai.

Relations have improved significantly between Israel and Egypt after the removal of Morsi from office in July 2013, with close military cooperation over the Sinai insurgency. Notably, Israel has permitted Egypt to increase its number of troops deployed in the Sinai peninsula beyond the terms of the peace treaty. These developments, along with deteriorating Israel-Jordan relations, have led some to brand Egypt as Israel's "closest ally" in the Arab world, while others assert that relations remain relatively cold. Sisi has maintained the policy of previous Egyptian presidents of pledging not to visit Israel until Israel recognizes Palestinian statehood, although his Foreign Minister, Sameh Shoukry, has visited Israel.

On 2 July 2015, one day after the attacks on 15 Egyptian Army checkpoints, Israel announced that it was giving Egypt a "free hand to operate in northern Sinai against local jihadist groups, voluntarily ignoring an annex to the 1979 Camp David Peace Accords banning the presence of significant Egyptian forces in the area." Israel also initiated a covert air campaign in support of the Egyptian forces in Sinai, carrying out frequent airstrikes against jihadists in coordination with Egypt. This marks the first time Israel and Egypt has fought on the same side in a war. To prevent a backlash in Egypt, both countries attempted to hide Israel's involvement, and Israeli drones, planes and helicopters carrying out missions in Sinai were all unmarked.

On November 3, 2015, Egypt voted for Israel joining the UNOOSA, marking the first time in history that Egypt has ever voted in Israel's favor at the United Nations.

Relations further improved after the election of Donald Trump as President of the United States and the ascension of Mohammed bin Salman to Crown Prince of Saudi Arabia, with Egypt joining these nations in pressuring the Palestinian Authority and Jordan to accept U.S.-led peace proposals.

On 22 March 2022, Sisi met with President of the United Arab Emirates Mohamed bin Zayed Al Nahyan and Naftali Bennett in Egypt. They discussed trilateral relations, Russo-Ukrainian War and the Iran nuclear deal.

Border incidents

The 2011 southern Israel cross-border attacks took place in August; attackers from Egypt killed eight Israelis. Eight attackers were reportedly killed by Israeli security forces, and two more by Egyptian security. Five Egyptian soldiers were also killed. In response, protesters stormed the Israeli embassy.  During the protests, Ahmad Al-Shahhat climbed to the roof of the Israeli Embassy and removed the Israeli flag, which was then burned by protesters.

On 5 August 2012, the 2012 Egyptian–Israeli border attack occurred, when armed men ambushed an Egyptian military base in the Sinai Peninsula, killing 16 soldiers and stealing two armored cars, which they used to infiltrate into Israel. The attackers broke through the Kerem Shalom border crossing to Israel, where one of the vehicles exploded. They then engaged in a firefight with soldiers of the Israel Defense Forces, during which six of the attackers were killed. No Israelis were injured.

Israel is building a 5-meter-high fence along its border with Egypt known as the Egypt–Israel barrier. The fence will stretch along 240 kilometers, from the Kerem Shalom passage in the north to Eilat in the south. The fence was planned to block the infiltration of refugees and asylum seekers from Africa, but took on heightened urgency with the fall of Mubarak's regime.

Security cooperation
Security cooperation was increased as a result of the 2012 Egyptian–Israeli border attack and the ensuing Operation Eagle against Egyptian soldiers in the Sinai. Egyptian Colonel Ahmed Mohammed Ali said that "Egypt is co-ordinating with the Israeli side over the presence of Egyptian armed forces in Sinai. They know this. The deployment of the armed forces on all the territory of Sinai is not a violation of the peace treaty between Egypt and Israel."

Diplomatic mediation
Egypt's post-Mubarak rulers were instrumental in mediating between Hamas and Israel for the Gilad Shalit prisoner exchange that led to the liberation of Israeli soldier Gilad Shalit in exchange for 1,027 Palestinian prisoners between October and December 2011.

Economic ties
According to the Israel Export & International Cooperation Institute, there were 117 exporters to Egypt active in Israel in 2011 and exports of goods from Israel to Egypt grew by 60% in 2011, to $236 million.

The pipeline which supplies gas from Egypt to Jordan and Israel was attacked eight times between Mubarak's ousting on February 11 and November 25, 2011. Egypt had a 20-year deal to export natural gas to Israel. The deal is unpopular with the Egyptian public and critics say Israel was paying below market price for the gas. Gas supplies to Israel were unilaterally halted by Egypt in 2012 because Israel had allegedly breached its obligations and stopped payments a few months prior. Critical of the decision, Israeli Prime Minister Benjamin Netanyahu also insisted the cut-off was not to do with the peace treaty but rather "a business dispute between the Israeli company and the Egyptian company"; Egyptian Ambassador Yasser Rida also said the Egyptian government saw it as a business disagreement, not a diplomatic dispute. Foreign Minister Avigdor Lieberman said the same, adding that perhaps the gas supplies were being used as campaign material for the Egyptian presidential election. Minister of National Infrastructure Uzi Landau dismissed claims that the dispute was purely commercial in nature.

See also 

 History of the Jews in Egypt
 Taba Border Crossing
 International recognition of Israel

References

Bibliography 

 Barnett, Michael N. Confronting the costs of war: military power, state, and society in Egypt and Israel (1992) online
 Cohen, Stephen P., and Edward E. Azar. "From war to peace: The transition between Egypt and Israel." Journal of Conflict Resolution 25.1 (1981): 87–114. online
 Friedlander, Melvin A. Sadat and Begin: The domestic politics of peacemaking (Routledge, 2019). online
 Gat, Moshe, ed. In search of a peace settlement: Egypt and Israel between the wars, 1967-1973 (Springer, 2012). excerpt
 Gawrych, George Walter. The albatross of decisive victory: War and policy between Egypt and Israel in the 1967 and 1973 Arab-Israeli wars (Greenwood, 2000).
 Kliot, Nurit. The evolution of the Egypt-Israel boundary: From colonial foundations to peaceful borders (IBRU, 1995).
 Landau, Emily B. "Egypt, Israel, and the WMDFZ Conference for the Middle East: Setting the Record Straight." Israel Journal of Foreign Affairs 7.1 (2013): 13–16. online
 Lee, Lai M. Historical Review of U.S. Foreign Aid as a Tool of Foreign Policy in Israel and Egypt During 1952-1969(Thesis, School of Advanced Military Studies, United States Army Command and General Staff College, 2012) online
 Maoz, Zeev, and Allison Astorino. "The cognitive structure of peacemaking: Egypt and Israel, 1970-1978." Political Psychology (1992): 647–662. online
 Oren, Michael B. "Escalation to Suez: The Egypt-Israel Border War, 1949-56." Journal of Contemporary History 24.2 (1989): 347–375. online
 Oren, Michael B. "Secret Egypt‐Israel peace initiatives prior to the Suez campaign." Middle Eastern Studies 26.3 (1990): 351–370.
 Oren, Michael B. The Origins of the Second Arab-Israel War: Egypt, Israel and the Great Powers, 1952-56 (Routledge, 2013).
 Podeh, Elie. Chances for Peace: Missed Opportunities in the Arab-Israeli Conflict (University of Texas Press, 2021) excerpt
 Porat, Liad. The Muslim Brotherhood and Egypt-Israel Peace (Begin-Sadat Center for Strategic Studies, Bar-Ilan University, 2014).
 Shalom, Zaki. The superpowers, Israel and the future of Jordan, 1960-1963 : the perils of the pro-Nasser policy (1999) online
 Sharnoff, Michael. Nasser’s Peace: Egypt’s Response to the 1967 War with Israel (Routledge, 2017) excerpt
 Shikaki, Khalil. "The nuclearization debates: The cases of Israel and Egypt." Journal of Palestine Studies 14.4 (1985): 77–91. online
 Stein, Janice Gross. "Deterrence and learning in an enduring rivalry: Egypt and Israel, 1948–73." Security Studies 6.1 (1996): 104–152. online
 Stein, Kenneth W. Heroic Diplomacy: Sadat, Kissinger, Carter, Begin and the Quest for Arab-Israeli Peace (Routledge, 2002). online
 Steinberg, Gerald M., and Ziv Rubinovitz, eds. Menachem Begin and the Israel-Egypt Peace Process: Between Ideology and Political Realism (Indiana University Press, 2017) excerpt
 
 Wright, Lawrence. Thirteen days in September : Carter, Begin, and Sadat at Camp David (2014) online

Primary sources
 Laqueur, Walter, and Dan Schueftan, eds. The Israel-Arab Reader: A Documentary History of the Middle East Conflict (8th ed. Penguin, 2016). online 2001 edition

External links
  Israeli Ministry of Foreign Affairs about the relation with Egypt
  Israeli embassy in Cairo

 
Israel
Bilateral relations of Israel